Kony Montoy Ealy (born December 21, 1991) is a gridiron football defensive end for the Edmonton Elks of the Canadian Football League (CFL). He played college football at Missouri and was drafted by the Carolina Panthers in the second round of the 2014 NFL Draft.

Early years
Ealy attended New Madrid County Central in New Madrid, Missouri, where he was a three-sport athlete in football, basketball and track. In football, he notched 89 tackles, including 31 tackles for loss, and 10.5 quarterback sacks while adding 21 quarterback hurries in his junior season; on offense, he caught 22 passes for 501 yards and 3 touchdowns. 

He was a first-team All-state, All-conference, All-region and All-district selection as a senior, after he amassed 104 total tackles, 28 tackles for loss, 12.5 sacks, 31 quarterback pressures, 5 forced fumbles, 7 pass break ups, 4 blocked kicks. He was also a standout in basketball, where he earned All-state, and numerous All-district, All-region and All-conference honors.

Considered a four-star recruit by Rivals.com, Ealy was rated as the 11th best weakside defensive end prospect of his class.

College career
Ealy accepted a football scholarship from the University of Missouri. In 2010, he was redshirted as a true freshman. In 2011, Ealy earned a back-up role, recording 13 tackles, one sack, and three tackles for loss in 12 games. He made his first career start at Baylor. During the Independence Bowl against North Carolina, Ealy recorded 2 tackles, including a half-tackle for loss. He was named to the Big 12 All-Freshman Team. 

In 2012, he started 10 games for the Tigers, recording 37 tackles, including 10 tackles for loss, 3.5 sacks and 7 pass break-ups, and 5 quarterback pressures. In 2013, he started all 14 games, setting a new career high in tackles with 43, tackles for loss with 14.5, and sacks with 9.5, while forcing three fumbles and intercepting one pass which he returned 49 yards for a touchdown against Indiana. For his play, Ealy was named to the first-team All-SEC.

Ealy announced on January 3, 2014 that he would forgo his senior season and enter the 2014 NFL Draft.

Professional career
As a sophomore the year before, Ealy was given a third round grade by the NFL Draft Advisory Board, which is typically conservative when projecting the draft positions of underclassmen. Following his breakout junior campaign, Ealy was a projected first round pick by numerous outlets, including the Panthers General Manager Dave Gettleman, with some projecting him as a potential top 10 selection. His combination of length, athleticism, and versatility drew comparisons to players including Robert Quinn, Michael Bennett, and Chandler Jones. Dallas Cowboys executive vice president Stephen Jones noted after the 2014 NFL Draft that had the Cowboys not traded the number 47 overall selection in a deal to move up to select Boise State defensive end DeMarcus Lawrence, they would have used that pick to draft Ealy, whom they regarded as an immediate starter.

Ealy was selected by the Carolina Panthers in the second round (60th overall) pick of the 2014 NFL Draft.

Carolina Panthers

2014 season

On May 29, 2014, Ealy signed a four-year $3.55 million deal. Per Pro Football Focus, Ealy was one of the highest-graded run defenders of the NFL in the preseason. He made his NFL debut performance in week 2 when the Panthers defeated the Detroit Lions in a 24–7 victory. In their week 8 matchup against the defending champion Seattle Seahawks, Ealy had his best game of the season with two solo tackles and the first sack of his NFL career against Russell Wilson. In their week 14 win over the Tampa Bay Buccaneers, Ealy recorded his 2nd career NFL sack against Josh McCown. Ealy followed this up with another sack of Brian Hoyer during the Panthers week 15 win over the Cleveland Browns, beating Joe Thomas.  On December 23, 2014, Ealy was named to Sports Illustrated All-Rookie Team. During the final game of the season, Ealy recorded a sack on Atlanta quarterback, Matt Ryan, recording a sack in each of the final three games of his rookie season. Over the final four games of the season, Ealy also recorded nine QB pressures to double his total over any other four game segment of his rookie season. Ealy finished his rookie season with 12 tackles, 4 sacks, and 1 forced fumble. He was named to the Sports Illustrated All-Rookie Team of 2014.

2015 season
Ealy's development continued through the 2015 preseason where he recorded 2 sacks and was named a full-time starter opposite to Charles Johnson. During the Panthers Week 2 victory over the Houston Texans, Ealy recorded his first quarterback pressure of the year. During the Panthers week 4 victory over the Tampa Bay Buccaneers, Ealy recorded a career-high five tackles, 1 TFL, and a QB hit. During the Panthers victory over the Indianopolis Colts during week 7, Ealy recorded his first strip sack of the season against quarterback Andrew Luck. During the Panthers 37–29 victory over the Green Bay Packers that helped the Panthers move to 8–0 in the first time in franchise history, Ealy recorded a strip sack for the second consecutive week against quarterback Aaron Rodgers. Ealy managed 10 quarterback pressures through six games, but recorded six over the last two games. The following week, Ealy picked up a sack in his third straight game against Marcus Mariota during the Panthers 27–10 victory over the Tennessee Titans. The next week, during the Panthers 44–16 victory over the Washington Redskins to move them to 10–0, Ealy had his fourth straight game with a sack of quarterback Kirk Cousins and on the same play, recorded a forced fumble and a fumble recovery. During the Panthers 33–14 victory over the Dallas Cowboys, Ealy recorded a sack in his 5th straight game. During Super Bowl 50 against the Denver Broncos, Ealy tied the Super Bowl record and set the Panthers' postseason record with three sacks, accomplishing this in only 23 total snaps. In addition, he recorded an interception and forced fumble in the game. The Panthers lost the Super Bowl by a score of 24–10. Ealy became the first player in Super Bowl history to have an interception and multiple sacks. He was the first player since 1993 to record multiple sacks, an interception and a forced fumble in a postseason game. He tied both Reggie White and Darnell Dockett for the most sacks in a Super Bowl with three.

2016 season
In 2016, Ealy played all 16 games, but only started six. He recorded 32 tackles, five sacks, and one interception.

New England Patriots
On March 10, 2017, Ealy was traded to the New England Patriots along with a third-round draft pick in the 2017 NFL Draft in exchange for New England's 2017 second-round draft pick. On August 26, 2017, Ealy was waived by the team.

New York Jets
On August 27, 2017, Ealy was claimed off waivers by the New York Jets. In the Week 4 win over the Jacksonville Jaguars, he recorded his second interception after batting down a pass from quarterback Blake Bortles.

Dallas Cowboys
On April 5, 2018, he signed as a free agent with the Dallas Cowboys, who coveted him as a player since the 2014 NFL Draft. He could never distinguish himself in preseason, even after being tried at defensive tackle. He was released on September 1.

Oakland Raiders
On November 5, 2018, Ealy was signed by the Oakland Raiders. He was released on November 13. He was signed on December 5. He wasn't re-signed after the season.

Houston Roughnecks
In October 2019, Ealy was picked by the Houston Roughnecks during the open phase of the 2020 XFL Draft. In March, amid the COVID-19 pandemic, the league announced that it would be cancelling the rest of the season. Playing in all 5 games, he had 9 tackles (2 for loss) and half a sack. He had his contract terminated when the league suspended operations on April 10, 2020.

Toronto Argonauts
On February 22, 2021, Ealy signed with the Toronto Argonauts of the Canadian Football League. In the following year, he was released with the final training camp cuts on June 5, 2022.

Vegas Knight Hawks
On June 15, 2022, Ealy signed with the Vegas Knight Hawks of the Indoor Football League (IFL).

Edmonton Elks
On July 21, 2022, Ealy signed with the Edmonton Elks of the Canadian Football League (CFL).

NFL career statistics

Personal life
Ealy has two sisters, LaToya Brown and Sierra Jones. Sierra is one-year older than Ealy and suffers from a rare, lifelong chromosome disorder. LaToya died in September 2017 from a respiratory disease.

He is a father of one daughter, Royal, who was born in November 2015.

References

External links

Missouri Tigers bio

1991 births
Living people
People from New Madrid, Missouri
Players of American football from Missouri
American football defensive ends
Missouri Tigers football players
Carolina Panthers players
New England Patriots players
New York Jets players
Dallas Cowboys players
Oakland Raiders players
Houston Roughnecks players
Toronto Argonauts players